Roy Keenan (26 August 1930 – 21 May 2003) was a Canadian boxer. He competed in the men's light welterweight event at the 1952 Summer Olympics. His brother, Jack also was a boxer, competing at the 1948 Summer Olympics.

References

1930 births
2003 deaths
Canadian male boxers
Olympic boxers of Canada
Boxers at the 1952 Summer Olympics
Boxers from Montreal
Light-welterweight boxers